Achrosis is a genus of moths in the family Geometridae.

Species
 Achrosis alienata Walker, 1862
 Achrosis calcicola Holloway, 1993
 Achrosis classeyi Holloway, 1993
 Achrosis excitata (Prout, 1928)
 Achrosis fulvifusa (Warren, 1901)
 Achrosis incitata (Walker, 1862)
 Achrosis innotata (Warren, 1897)
 Achrosis intexta (Swinhoe, 1891)
 Achrosis kerangatis Holloway, 1993
 Achrosis lilacina (Warren, 1901)
 Achrosis lithosiaria Walker, 1862
 Achrosis longiurca Holloway, 1993
 Achrosis multidentata (Warren, 1894)
 Achrosis pallida (Moore, 1877)
 Achrosis purpurascens (Warren, 1894)
 Achrosis pyrrhularia Guenée, 1857
 Achrosis quadraria Warren, 1893
 Achrosis recitata Holloway, 1993
 Achrosis rigorata (Prout, 1932)
 Achrosis rondelaria (Fabricius, 1775)
 Achrosis semifulva (Pagenstecher, 1886)
 Achrosis serpentinaria (Walker, 1866)
 Achrosis spurca (Swinhoe, 1902)
 Achrosis transviridis Holloway, 1993
 Achrosis viridapex (Holloway, 1976)

References
 Achrosis at Markku Savela's Lepidoptera and some other life forms

Hypochrosini
Geometridae genera
Taxa named by Achille Guenée